The Definitive Collection is a 1997 greatest hits album of all the singles released by Cleveland, Ohio singer-songwriter Eric Carmen. It features five hits by the Raspberries, a power pop group which he led in the early 1970s. It also contains his versions of two major hits which he wrote for Shaun Cassidy, two popular songs from the movie Dirty Dancing, and his greatest hit, "All By Myself", which peaked at No. 2 on the Billboard Hot 100 on March 5, 1976.

Critical reception

Stephen Thomas Erlewine of AllMusic writes, "The Definitive Collection lives up to its title. Over the course of a single disc, the compilation features all of Eric Carmen's best-known songs and biggest hits"

Track listing

Musicians

Eric Carmen – Bass, Drums, Guitar, Acoustic Guitar, Electric Guitar, Rhythm Guitar, Harpsichord, Mellotron, Percussion, Piano, Electric Piano, Synthesizer, Tack Piano, Vocals, Background Vocals
Jim Bonfanti – Drums, Vocals
Mike Botts – Drums
Ollie E. Brown – Percussion
Wally Bryson – Guitar, Acoustic Guitar, Rhythm Guitar, Vocals
Charles Calello – Horn Arrangements
Tony Camillo – Horn Arrangements
Burton Cummings – Piano
 – Percussion
Jimmie Haskell – Horn Arrangements
James Newton Howard – Synthesizer
Dan Hrdlicka – Guitar, Background Vocals
Bruce Johnston – Background Vocals
Steve Knill – Bass, Background Vocals
Danny Kortchmar – Acoustic Guitar
D. Dwight Krueger – Drums, Percussion, Background Vocals
Michael McBride – Drums, Percussion, Vocals, Background Vocals
Scott McCarl – Bass, Acoustic Guitar, Vocals
Tommy Morgan – Harmonica
Nigel Olsson – Drums, Background Vocals
Joe Porcaro – Drums, Percussion
Richard Reising – Guitar, Electric Guitar, Harpsichord, Synthesizer, Background Vocals
Valerie Carter – Background Vocals
Joe Chemay – Background Vocals
Curt Becher – Background Vocals
Brenda Russell – Background Vocals
Brian Russell – Background Vocals
Samantha Sang – Background Vocals
George Sipl – Organ, Synthesizer, Background Vocals
Dave Smalley – Bass, Rhythm Guitar, Vocals
Jai Winding – Piano, Electric Piano
Dave Wintour – Bass
Richie Zito – Electric Guitar

Production

Eric Carmen – Arranger, Producer
Bob Irwin – Compilation Producer, Mastering, Producer
Bob Gaudio – Producer
Jimmy Ienner – Executive Producer, Producer
Tom Rabstenek – Mastering
George Marino – Mastering
Greg Calbi – Mastering
Doug Sax – Mastering
Bernie Grundman – Mastering
Mark Howlett – Engineer
Tim Kramer – Engineer
Jim Bell – Engineer
Kevin Beamish – Engineer
Arnei Rosenberg – Engineer
Shelly Yakus – Engineer
Howard Steele – Engineer
Thom Wilson – Engineer
Jack Sherdel – Engineer
Dennis Kirk – Engineer
David Henson – Engineer
Don Gehman – Engineer
Larry Emerine – Engineer
Tony d'Amico – Engineer
Jim DeMain – Engineer, Remixing
Val Garay – Mixing
Joe Barbaria – Assistant Engineer
Rod O'Brien – Assistant Engineer
George Ybara – Assistant Engineer
Corky Stasiak – Assistant Engineer
David Thoener – Assistant Engineer
Kevin Herron – Assistant Engineer
Dennis Ferrante – Assistant Engineer
George Sipl – Remixing
Rita Karidis – Art Direction

Track information and credits adapted from AllMusic and the album's liner notes.

References

External links
Eric Carmen Official Site
Raspberries Official Site
Arista Records Official Site

1997 greatest hits albums
Eric Carmen albums
Arista Records compilation albums

de:Gene Estes